Courtney Howard (born November 7, 1978) is a Canadian ER physician who was President of the Canadian Association of Physicians for the Environment, as well as a board member with the Canadian Medical Association, Associate Professor at the University of Calgary Cumming School of Medicine, and a former candidate for the leadership of the Green Party of Canada based in Yellowknife, Northwest Territories.

Howard attended Simon Fraser University and went to medical school at McGill University. Howard has been featured or published in The Lancet, People, The Conversation, the National Observer, and other publications.

Publications

Electoral record
{| class="wikitable"
|+2020 Green Party of Canada leadership election results by round
! colspan="2" rowspan="2" |Candidate
! colspan="2" |1st round
! colspan="2" |2nd round
! colspan="2" |3rd round
! colspan="2" |4th round
! colspan="2" |5th round
! colspan="2" |6th round
! colspan="2" |7th round
! colspan="2" |8th round
|-
!Votes cast
!%
!Votes cast
!%
!Votes cast
!%
!Votes cast
!%
!Votes cast
!%
!Votes cast
!%
!Votes cast
!%
!Votes cast
!%
|- style="background:lightgreen;"
|
|Annamie Paul
|6,242
|26.14%
|6,242
|26.16%
|6,305
|26.24%
|6,478
|27.23%
|6,952
|29.44%
|7,614
|32.52%
|8,862
|38.52%
|12,090
|54.53%
|-
|
|Dimitri Lascaris
|5,768
|24.15%
|5,773
|24.20%
|5,813
|24.40%
|6,586
|27.69%
|7,050
|29.86%
|7,551
|32.25%
|8,340
|36.22%
|10,081
|45.47%
|-
|
|Courtney Howard
|3,285
|13.76%
|3,285
|13.77%
|3,348
|14.05%
|3,404
|14.31%
|3,762
|15.93%
|4,523
|19.32%
|5,824
|25.29%
| colspan="2" style="background:pink; text-align:center" |Eliminated
|-
|
|Glen Murray
|2,745
|11.50%
|2,746
|11.51%
|2,821
|11.84%
|2,846
|11.96%
|2,992
|12.67%
|3,725
|15.91%
| colspan="4" style="background:pink; text-align:center" |Eliminated
|-
|
|David Merner
|2,636
|11.04%
|2,636
|11.05%
|2,697
|11.32%
|2,727
|11.46%
|2,856
|12.10%
| colspan="6" style="background:pink; text-align:center" |Eliminated
|-
|
|Amita Kuttner
|1,468
|6.15%
|1,470
|6.16%
|1,486
|6.24%
|1,748
|7.35%
| colspan="8" style="background:pink; text-align:center" |Eliminated
|-
|
|Meryam Haddad
|1,345
|5.63%
|1,346
|5.64%
|1,358
|5.70%
| colspan="10" style="background:pink; text-align:center" |Eliminated
|-
|
|Andrew West
|352
|1.47%
|356
|1.49%
| colspan="12" style="background:pink; text-align:center" |Eliminated
|-
|
|None Of The Above
|36
|0.15%
| colspan="14" style="background:pink; text-align:center" |Eliminated
|-
! colspan="2" |Total
! align="right" |23,877
! align="right" |100%
! align="right" |23,854
! align="right" |100%
! align="right" |23,828
! align="right" |100%
! align="right" |23,788
! align="right" |100%
! align="right" |23,612
! align="right" |100%
! align="right" |23,413
! align="right" |100%
! align="right" |23,026
! align="right" |100%
! align="right" |22,171
! align="right" |100%

References

External links

1978 births
Living people
Green Party of Canada politicians
People from Vancouver
People from Yellowknife
Women in Northwest Territories politics
Academic staff of the University of Calgary
Simon Fraser University alumni
McGill University Faculty of Medicine alumni
Canadian emergency physicians
Canadian women physicians
Physicians from the Northwest Territories
21st-century Canadian women politicians
21st-century Canadian physicians